Loek Dikker (born ) is a Dutch pianist, conductor, and composer. Dikker is known for his scores for the films The Fourth Man, Body Parts, and Rosenstraße, among others.

Biography
After training as a classical pianist, Dikker became a jazz musician after seeing a 1959 televised performance by Horace Silver and Sonny Rollins. He gave his first jazz performance in 1960, in a jazz and poetry concert with Godfried Bomans. He later performed in the bands of Hans Dulfer and Theo Loevendie, and with American instrumentalists Oliver Nelson, Cannonball Adderley, and Don Byas. In the mid-1970s, he founded his Waterland Ensemble. He wrote his first film score in 1981, and has scored over sixty films.

Dikker is the founder and chairman of Muziekinstituut MultiMedia, an organization founded in 2006 to promote and encourage collaboration among multimedia composers. He is also a board member of FFACE, the Federation of Film and Audiovisual Composers of Europe.

Dikker's sister, is a screenwriter and director.

Filmography (as composer)
  (1981)The Fourth Man (1983)Peaceful Days (1984)De droomproducenten (1984) – documentaryHet bittere kruid (1985)Passage: A Richard Erdman Sculpture (1985) – documentarySlow Burn (1986) – television movieIris (1987)Pascali's Island (1988)Een scherzo furioso (1990)Dilemma (1990)Body Parts (1991)Nie wieder schlafen (1992)The Forbidden Quest (1993)Prinzenbad (1993)De tussentijd (1993)The Babysitter (1995)The Commissioner (1998) The Escape (1998) – television movieKinderland ist abgebrannt (1998) – documentaryDiva Dolorosa (1999) – documentaryFührer Ex (2002)Science Fiction (2002)
Rosenstraße (2003)Giacomo Casanova (2004)  – television movieWolfsbergen (2004)Der junge Beethoven (2007)

Musical recordings
JazzLove Cry and Super Nimbus (1970)Tan Tango (1975)Domesticated Doomsday (1978)The Waterland Big Band Is hot! Part 1 / Part 2 (1979)Mayhem in our Streets (1980)Summer Suite (1982)

ClassicalTo Paul Desmond (1991)Overijssels Volkslied (2000)South Side Ground Zero Boogie Blues (2004)

Awards
1983: Silver Desk for Best Dutch film music, for The Fourth Man1990: Golden Calf, for his body of work from 1985–1990
1991: Saturn Award for Best Music, for Body Parts2004: Ravello Cinemusica (Italy), for Best European film music, for Rosenstraße''

References

Dutch film score composers
Dutch jazz composers
Dutch pianists
Dutch conductors (music)
Male conductors (music)
20th-century conductors (music)
Musicians from Amsterdam
1944 births
Living people
21st-century conductors (music)
21st-century pianists
Male film score composers
Male jazz composers
20th-century Dutch male musicians
21st-century male musicians
Varèse Sarabande Records artists
20th-century jazz composers